Eugénie was a French 16-gun privateer ship-sloop launched in 1793. The French Navy requisitioned her in March 1794 for coastal escort and patrol purposes. After the navy returned her to civilian ownership at Nantes in February 1796 she returned to privateering.

On 16 March 1798  was escorting a small convoy when she spied a privateer lurking about, seeking an opportunity to pick off a prize. Captain Michael de Courcy set Magnanime in chase. She had  been armed with 18 guns, eight of which she had thrown overboard during the chase, and had a crew of 107 men. She was coppered and appeared completely new.

She arrived at Plymouth on 4 May. The Royal Navy took her into service under the name HMS Pandour, but never commissioned her. In 1800 her name became HMS Wolf. Wolf never saw active duty either.

The Admiralty offered her for sale at Plymouth on 31 August 1801. She was broken up in 1802.

Notes, citations, and references
Notes

Citations

References

 

Brigs of the Royal Navy
1793 ships
Captured ships
Privateer ships of France
Ships built in France